Porphyronoorda is a genus of moths of the family Crambidae. It contains only one species, Porphyronoorda decumbens, which is found in India.

References

Natural History Museum Lepidoptera genus database

Odontiinae
Taxa named by Eugene G. Munroe
Crambidae genera
Monotypic moth genera